Green Township is one of thirteen townships in Noble County, Indiana, United States. As of the 2010 census, its population was 2,123 and it contained 734 housing units.

History
The Stanley School-District No. 2 was listed on the National Register of Historic Places in 2014.

Geography

Unincorporated towns
 Green Center at 
(This list is based on USGS data and may include former settlements.)

Cemeteries
The township contains Grays Cemetery.

Major highways
  U.S. Route 33

Airports and landing strips
 Green Center Airport

Lakes
 Bowen Lake
 Dock Lake
 Hickman Lake
 Krieger Lake
 Lindsey Lake
 Long Lake
 Mc Henry Lake
 Millers Lake
 Norman Lake
 River Lake
 Sand Lake
 Sucker Lake
 Summit Lake

School districts
 Smith-Green Community Schools

Political districts
 Indiana's 3rd congressional district
 State House District 83
 State Senate District 13

References
 
 United States Census Bureau 2008 TIGER/Line Shapefiles
 IndianaMap

External links
 Indiana Township Association
 United Township Association of Indiana
 City-Data.com page for Green Township

Townships in Noble County, Indiana
Townships in Indiana